South Amana is an unincorporated community and census-designated place (CDP) in northern Iowa County, Iowa, United States, and is part of the "seven villages" of the Amana Colonies. As of the 2010 census, it had a population of 159.

It lies along U.S. Route 6, east of the city of Marengo, the county seat of Iowa County. South Amana has a post office with the ZIP code of 52334, which opened on 19 June 1874.

South Amana was a shipping point on the Chicago, Rock Island and Pacific Railroad.

Demographics

References

Amana Colonies
Unincorporated communities in Iowa County, Iowa
Unincorporated communities in Iowa
Census-designated places in Iowa County, Iowa
Populated places established in 1874
1874 establishments in Iowa